José Miguel Ballivian, born 17 December 1997, is a discus thrower from Chile.

Competitions
Ballivian competed in the 2014 Summer Youth Olympics in Nanjing, China. He is the South American Junior Champion 2014.

Personal bests
 Discus Throw 1,750 kg 57.15
 Discus Throw 1,500 kg 53.94
 Shot Put 6 kg 18.41
 Shot Put 5 kg 17.14

References

Chilean male discus throwers
1997 births
Living people
Athletes (track and field) at the 2014 Summer Youth Olympics
21st-century Chilean people